St. Andrews Episcopal Church is a historic church at 120 E. Woodin Avenue in Chelan, Washington, United States.  It was built in 1897 and added to the National Register of Historic Places in 1992.  The architect was Karl Gunnar Malmgren from the firm Cutter & Malmgren of Spokane Washington.

References

19th-century Episcopal church buildings
Buildings and structures in Chelan County, Washington
Churches completed in 1897
Episcopal churches in Washington (state)
Churches on the National Register of Historic Places in Washington (state)
National Register of Historic Places in Chelan County, Washington